Untersberg-Arena is a football stadium in Grödig, Austria.  It is home to SV Grödig and FC Liefering.

History
After SV Grödig was promoted to the Austrian Bundesliga in 2013, the capacity was expanded to the current capacity of 4,128.

References

Football venues in Austria